A Son de Guerra Tour, stylized Asondeguerra Tour, is a live album from Dominican singer Juan Luis Guerra. It was recorded during the A Son de Guerra World Tour at Santo Domingo in front of 42,000 audience.

Reception 
Thom Jurek of AllMusic gave the album a positive review and wrote "This is a stellar live offering, impeccably performed and recorded"
 
A Son de Guerra Tour debuted and peaked at number 80 on the Billboard 200. It also peaked and debuted at number one in the Billboard Top Latin Albums and Tropical Albums charts. A Son de Guerra Tour won the Contemporary Tropical Album in 2013.

Track listing

Charts

Weekly charts

Year-end charts

Sales and certifications

References 

2013 live albums
Juan Luis Guerra live albums
Latin Grammy Award for Best Contemporary Tropical Album
Spanish-language live albums